Coleophora phaeocentra is a moth of the family Coleophoridae. It is found in Zimbabwe.

References

Endemic fauna of Zimbabwe
phaeocentra
Lepidoptera of Zimbabwe
Moths of Sub-Saharan Africa
Moths described in 1914